Mary Boleyn, also known as Lady Mary, (c. 1499 – 19 July 1543) was the sister of English queen consort Anne Boleyn, whose family enjoyed considerable influence during the reign of King Henry VIII.

Mary was one of the mistresses of Henry VIII for an unknown period of time. It has been rumoured that she bore two of the king's children, though Henry did not acknowledge either of them. Mary was also rumoured to have been a mistress of Henry VIII's rival, King Francis I of France, for some period between 1515 and 1519.

Mary Boleyn was married twice: in 1520 to William Carey, and again, secretly, in 1534, to William Stafford, a soldier from a good family but with few prospects. This secret marriage to a man considered beneath her station angered both King Henry VIII and her sister, Queen Anne, and resulted in Mary's banishment from the royal court. She died seven years later, having spent the remainder of her life in obscurity.

Early life
Mary was probably born at Blickling Hall, the family seat in Norfolk, and grew up at Hever Castle, Kent. She was the daughter of a rich diplomat and courtier, Thomas Boleyn, later Earl of Wiltshire, by his marriage to Elizabeth Howard, the eldest daughter of Thomas Howard, Earl of Surrey (later 2nd Duke of Norfolk).

There is no evidence of Mary's exact date of birth, but it occurred sometime between 1499 and 1508. Most historians suggest that she was the eldest of the three surviving Boleyn children. Evidence suggests that the Boleyn family treated Mary as the eldest child; in 1597, her grandson Lord Hunsdon claimed the earldom of Ormond on the grounds that he was the Boleyns' legitimate heir. Many ancient peerages can descend through female heirs, in the absence of an immediate male heir. If Anne had been the elder sister, the better claim to the title would have belonged to her daughter, Queen Elizabeth I. However, it appears that Queen Elizabeth offered Mary's son, Henry, the earldom as he was dying, although he declined it. If Mary had been the eldest Boleyn sister, Henry would, indeed, have the better claim to the title, regardless of a new grant from the queen. There is more evidence to suggest that Mary was older than Anne. She was married first, on 4 February 1520; an elder daughter was traditionally married before her younger sister. Moreover, in 1532, when Anne was created Marchioness of Pembroke, she was referred to as "one of the daughters of Thomas Boleyn". Were she the eldest, that status would probably have been mentioned. Overall, most historians now accept Mary as being the eldest child, placing her birth some time in 1499.

During her early years, it is most likely that Mary was educated alongside her brother George, and her sister, Anne at Hever Castle in Kent. She was given a conventional education deemed essential for young ladies of her rank and status, which included the basic principles of arithmetic, grammar, history, reading, spelling, and writing. In addition to her family genealogy, Mary learned the feminine accomplishments of dancing, embroidery, etiquette, household management, music, needlework, and singing, and games such as cards and chess. She was also taught archery, falconry, riding, and hunting.

Mary remained in England for most of her childhood, until she was sent abroad in 1514 around the age of fifteen when her father secured her a place as maid-of-honour to the King's sister, Princess Mary, who was going to Paris to marry King Louis XII of France.

After a few weeks, many of the Queen's English maids were sent away, but Mary was allowed to stay, probably due to the fact that her father was the new English ambassador to France. Even when Queen Mary left France after she was widowed on 1 January 1515, Mary remained behind at the court of Louis's son-in-law and daughter, Francis I and Claude.

Royal affair in France
Mary was joined in Paris by her father, Sir Thomas, and her sister, Anne, who had been studying in France for the previous year. During this time Mary is supposed to have embarked on sexual affairs, including one with King Francis himself. Although most historians believe that the reports of her sexual affairs are exaggerated, the French king referred to her as "The English Mare", "my hackney", and as "una grandissima ribalda, infame sopra tutte" ("a very great whore, the most infamous of all").

She returned to England in 1519, where she was appointed a maid-of-honour to Catherine of Aragon, the queen consort of Henry VIII. Mary was reportedly considered to be a great beauty, both at the French and English court.

Royal mistress

Soon after her return, Mary was married to William Carey, a wealthy and influential courtier, on 4 February 1520; Henry VIII was a guest at the couple's wedding. At some point, Mary became Henry's mistress; the starting date and duration of the liaison are unknown.

It was rumoured that one or both of Mary's children were fathered by the king. Even if this was so, however, Henry did not acknowledge either of them as his children, although he had previously acknowledged Henry FitzRoy, his son by another mistress, Elizabeth Blount.

Henry VIII's wife, Catherine of Aragon, had first been married to Henry's elder brother Arthur when he was a little over fifteen years old, but Arthur had died just a few months later. Henry later used this to justify the annulment of his marriage to Catherine, arguing that her marriage to Arthur had created an affinity between Henry and Catherine; as his brother's wife, under canon law she became his sister. In 1527, during his initial attempts to obtain a papal annulment of his marriage to Catherine, Henry in a similar way also requested a dispensation to marry Anne, the sister of his former mistress.

Sister's rise to power
Anne had returned to England in January 1522; she soon joined the royal court as one of Queen Catherine's maids-of-honour. Anne achieved considerable popularity at court, although the sisters already moved in different circles and were not thought to have been particularly close.

Although Mary was said to have been more attractive than her sister, Anne seems to have been more ambitious and intelligent. When the king took an interest in Anne, she refused to become his mistress. By the middle of 1526, Henry was determined to marry her. This gave him further incentive to seek the annulment of his marriage to Catherine of Aragon. When Mary's husband died during an outbreak of sweating sickness, Henry granted Anne Boleyn the wardship of her nephew, Henry Carey. Mary's husband had left her with considerable debts, and Anne arranged for her nephew to be educated at a respectable Cistercian monastery. Anne also interceded to secure her widowed sister an annual pension of £100.

Second marriage
In 1532, when Anne accompanied Henry to the English Pale of Calais on his way to a state visit to France, Mary was one of her companions. Anne was crowned queen on 1 June 1533 and on 7 September gave birth to Henry's daughter Elizabeth, who later became Queen Elizabeth I. In 1534, Mary secretly married an Essex landowner's younger son: William Stafford (later Sir William Stafford). Since Stafford was a soldier, his prospects as a second son so slight, and his income so small, many believed the union was a love match. When Mary became pregnant, the marriage was discovered. Queen Anne was furious, and the Boleyn family disowned Mary. The couple were banished from court.

Mary's financial circumstances became so desperate that she was reduced to begging the king's adviser Thomas Cromwell to speak to Henry and Anne on her behalf. She admitted that she might have chosen "a greater man of birth" but never one that should have loved her so well, nor a more honest man. And she went on, "I had rather beg my bread with him than to be the greatest queen in Christendom. And I believe verily ... he would not forsake me to be a king". Henry, however, seems to have been indifferent to her plight. Mary asked Cromwell to speak to her father, her uncle, and her brother, but to no avail. It was Anne who relented, sending Mary a magnificent golden cup and some money, but still refused to reinstate her position at court. This partial reconciliation was the closest the two sisters attained; it is not thought that they met after Mary's exile from the king's court.

Mary's life between 1534 and her sister's execution on 19 May 1536 is difficult to trace. There is no record of her visiting her parents, and no evidence of any correspondence with, or visits to, her sister Anne or her brother George when they were imprisoned in the Tower of London.

Mary died of unknown causes, on 19 July 1543, in her early forties.

Issue

Mary Boleyn was the mother of:

Catherine Carey (1524 – 15 January 1569). Maid-of-honour to both Anne of Cleves and Catherine Howard, she married a Puritan, Sir Francis Knollys, Knight of the Garter, by whom she had issue. She later became chief lady of the bedchamber to her cousin, Queen Elizabeth I. One of her daughters, Lettice Knollys, became the second wife of Robert Dudley, 1st Earl of Leicester, the favourite of Elizabeth I.
 Henry Carey, 1st Baron Hunsdon (4 March 1526 – 23 July 1596). He was ennobled by Queen Elizabeth I shortly after her coronation, and later made a Knight of the Garter. When he was dying, Elizabeth offered Henry the Boleyn family title of Earl of Ormond, which he had long sought, but at that point, declined. He was married to Anne Morgan, by whom he had issue.

Mary's marriage to William Stafford (d. 5 May 1556) may have resulted in the birth of two further children:

 Edward Stafford (1535–1545).
 Anne Stafford (b. 1536?), possibly named in honour of Mary's sister, Queen Anne Boleyn.

Depictions in fiction
Mary is featured in the following novels:
 Brief Gaudy Hour: A Novel of Anne Boleyn by Margaret Campbell Barnes (1949)
 Anne Boleyn by Evelyn Anthony (1957)
 The Concubine: A Novel Based Upon the Life of Anne Boleyn by Norah Lofts (1963)
 Anne, the Rose of Hever by Maureen Peters (1969)
 Anne Boleyn by Norah Lofts (1979)
 Mistress Anne: The Exceptional Life of Anne Boleyn by Carolly Erickson (1984)
 The Lady in the Tower by Jean Plaidy (1986)
 I, Elizabeth: the Word of a Queen by Rosalind Miles (1994)
 The Secret Diary of Anne Boleyn by Robin Maxwell (1997)
 Dear Heart, How Like You This? by Wendy J. Dunn (2002)
 Doomed Queen Anne by Carolyn Meyer (2002)
 Wolf Hall by Hilary Mantel (2009)

Mary has been the central character in three novels based on her life:
 Court Cadenza (later published under the title The Tudor Sisters) by British author Aileen Armitage (Aileen Quigley) (1974)
 The Last Boleyn by Karen Harper (1983)
 The Other Boleyn Girl by Philippa Gregory (2001)

Philippa Gregory later nominated Mary as her personal heroine in an interview with BBC History magazine. Her novel spawned five others in the same series, but drew criticism for its lack of historical accuracy. For example, Gregory characterizes Anne, not Mary, as the elder sister, and makes no mention of Mary's relationships prior to her affair with Henry.

Mary is a character in several films and television series:
 In the film Anne of the Thousand Days (1969), she is played by Valerie Gearon.
 In the BBC television film The Other Boleyn Girl (2003), based on the novel of the same name by Philippa Gregory, she is played by Natascha McElhone.
 In the Showtime television series The Tudors (2007–2010), she is played by Perdita Weeks.
 In the film The Other Boleyn Girl (2008), also based on Gregory's novel, she is played by Scarlett Johansson.
 In the miniseries Wolf Hall (2015), the television adaptation based on Hilary Mantel's novel of the same name, Mary is portrayed by Charity Wakefield.

Non-fiction
Mary is also a subject in three non-fiction books:
 Mary Boleyn: The Mistress of Kings by Alison Weir (2011)
 The Mistresses of Henry VIII by Kelly Hart (2009)
 Mary Boleyn: The True Story of Henry VIII's Mistress by Josephine Wilkinson (2010)

Family tree

References

Further reading
Adair, Anne. (2011). Mary Boleyn: Sister to Queen Anne Boleyn and Sister in Law to King Henry VIII. Webster's Digital Services. 
Bruce, Marie-Louise. (1972). Anne Boleyn
Denny, Joanna. (2004). Anne Boleyn: A New Life of England's Tragic Queen. Da Capo Press. 
Fraser, Antonia. (1992). The Wives of Henry VIII. Vintage. 
Gregory, Philippa. (2003). The Other Boleyn Girl.  Touchstone. 
Harper, Karen. (2006). The Last Boleyn: A Novel. Three Rivers Press. 
Hart, Kelly. (2009). The Mistresses of Henry VIII The History Press. 
Ives, Eric.(2004). The Life and Death of Anne Boleyn. Wiley-Blackwell. 
Lindsey, Karen. (1995). Divorced Beheaded Survived: A Feminist Reinterpretation of the Wives of Henry VIII. Da Capo Press. 
Lofts, Norah. (1979). Anne Boleyn.
Weir, Alison. (2011). Mary Boleyn: The Mistress of Kings. Ballantine Books. 
Weir, Alison.(1991). The Six Wives of Henry VIII. Grove Press. 
Wilkinson, Josephine. (2010). Mary Boleyn: The True Story of Henry VIII's Favorite Mistress.   Amberley. 

 
1490s births
1543 deaths
Mistresses of Henry VIII
Mistresses of Francis I of France
People from Blickling
People from Hever, Kent
Howard family (English aristocracy)
Mary
Daughters of British earls
Ladies of the Privy Chamber
16th-century English nobility
16th-century English women
Carey family
Household of Catherine of Aragon
Court of Francis I of France